Fayzobod District (Nohiyai Fayzobod) is a district in Tajikistan. One of the Districts of Republican Subordination, it is about 60 km east of Dushanbe. It borders on the city of Vahdat from the west and the north, the city of Roghun from the east, and the Khatlon Region from the south. Its capital is Fayzobod. The population of the district is 103,600 (January 2020 estimate).

Administrative divisions
They are as follows:

References

Districts of Tajikistan